USS Guinevere has been the name of more than one United States Navy ship, and may refer to:

, a patrol vessel commissioned in 1917 and wrecked in 1918
, a patrol vessel in commission from 1942 to 1945

Guinevere, USS